Robyn Cadwallader is an Australian writer of novels, short stories and poetry. In 2015 her debut historical fiction novel, The Anchoress, was published. For this novel, she was shortlisted for the 2015 Adelaide Festival Awards for Literature.

Cadwallader graduated from Monash University and has a PhD in medieval literature from Flinders University. She developed her 2002 thesis, The virgin, the dragon and the theorist : readings in the thirteenth-century, Seinte Marherete into her first book, Three Methods for Reading the Thirteenth-century Seinte Marherete, published in 2008.  In the past, she taught creative writing and medieval literature at the same university.

Cadwallader resides near Canberra, with her husband, Alan Cadwallader, an academic at the Australian Catholic University, and four children.

Bibliography

Awards and recognition
 2011 ACT Writing and Publishing Awards Short Story Award for "The Day for Travelling"
 2019 Voss Literary Prize, shortlisted for Book of Colours
 2019 ACT Book of the Year award winner for Book of Colours

References

External links
 

21st-century Australian women writers
21st-century Australian writers
Living people
Year of birth missing (living people)
Monash University alumni
Flinders University alumni